Government College of Physical Education for Women is a sports college situated in Dinhata, West Bengal. It was established in 1985. The college is affiliated with the Cooch Behar Panchanan Barma University.

See also

References

External links
www.gcpew.ac.in

Sport schools in India
Women's universities and colleges in West Bengal
Universities and colleges in Cooch Behar district
Colleges affiliated to Cooch Behar Panchanan Barma University
Academic institutions formerly affiliated with the University of North Bengal
Educational institutions established in 1985
1985 establishments in West Bengal